Doğan Güreş (15 February 1926 – 14 October 2014) was a Turkish general and True Path Party politician.

Education 
After he graduated from Kuleli Military High School in 1945, Güreş kept on studying at the Turkish Military Academy and accomplished a degree in 1947. Following, he received a degree from the School of Transportation in 1949. He was engaged in several posts in the Turkish Land Forces and in 1965 he also graduated from the Army Staff College.

Military career 
He was Chief of the General Staff of Turkey from 1990 to 1994, having been Commander of the First Army of Turkey (1987 - 1989) and Commander of the Turkish Army (1989 - 1990). As Necip Torumtay resigned from his post as Chief of General Staff, Gürsel was appointed in his stead the next day. In 1992 he proclaimed self-confidently that "Turkey is a military state". The 1991 Yeşilova incident took place under his tenure as Chief of the General Staff, as did the 1992 Operation Northern Iraq and the 26 July 1994 bombing of North Iraq.

Political career 
After his retirement as in 1994, he was elected to parliament for the True Path Party in the 1995 parliamentary elections (representing Kilis), and re-elected in 1999, serving until November 2002. He was also True Path's presidential candidate in the 2000 Turkish presidential election.

Doğan Güreş died in Ankara at the Gülhane Military Medical Academy where he was treated, on 14 October 2014.

See also
 Susurluk scandal

References 

1926 births
2014 deaths
Turkish Army generals
Chiefs of the Turkish General Staff
Commanders of the Turkish Land Forces
Democrat Party (Turkey, current) politicians
Members of the 21st Parliament of Turkey
Members of the 20th Parliament of Turkey